I (い in hiragana or イ in katakana) is one of the Japanese kana each of which represents one mora. い is based on the sōsho style of the kanji character 以, and イ is from the radical (left part) of the kanji character 伊. In the modern Japanese system of sound order, it occupies the second position of the syllable chart, between あ and う. Additionally, it is the first letter in Iroha, before ろ.  Both represent the sound .  In the Ainu language, katakana イ is written as y in their Latin-based syllable chart, and a small ィ after another katakana represents a diphthong.

Variant forms
Like other vowels, scaled-down versions of the kana (ぃ, ィ) are used to express sounds foreign to the Japanese language, such as フィ (fi). In some Okinawan writing systems, a small ぃ is also combined with the kana く (ku) and ふ to form the digraphs くぃ kwi and ふぃ hwi respectively, although the Ryukyu University system uses the kana ゐ/ヰ instead.

Origin
い comes from the left part of the Kanji 以, while イ originates from the left part of the Kanji 伊. An alternate form - 𛀆, based on the full cursive form of 以 is one of the most common hentaigana, as it merged with い late in the development of modern Japanese writing.

Stroke order

The Hiragana い is made in two strokes:
At the top left, a curved vertical stroke, ending with a hook at the bottom.
At the top right, a shorter stroke, slightly curving in the opposite direction.

The Katakana イ is made in two strokes:
At the top, a curved diagonal line going from right to left.
In the center of the last stroke, a vertical line going down.

Other communicative representations

 Full Braille representation

 When lengthening "-i" or "-e" syllables in Japanese braille, a chōon is always used, as is standard in katakana orthography, instead of adding the い / イ kana.

 Computer encodings

Footnotes

Specific kana